Miguel Cordero is the name of:

Miguel Cordero del Campillo (1925–2020), Spanish veterinarian and politician
Miguel Ángel Cordero (born 1987), Spanish footballer
Miguel Cordero (Venezuelan footballer) (born 1971), Venezuelan footballer
Miguel Febres Cordero (1854–1910), Ecuadorian Roman Catholic religious brother